Yulia Vaschenko, (née Karpenkova), is a Ukrainian football midfielder currently playing for Naftokhimik Kalush in the Ukrainian League. She has also played the UEFA Champions League with Zhytlobud Kharkiv and Lehenda Chernihiv, making her debut in 2007 with the former.

She was a member of the Ukrainian national team for fourteen years since her debut in 1996, playing the 2009 European Championship.

Honours
Lehenda Chernihiv
 Ukrainian Women's League (2) 2000, 2001
 Women's Cup (1) 2001

References

1978 births
Living people
Footballers from Dnipro
Ukrainian women's footballers
WFC Lehenda-ShVSM Chernihiv players
WFC Zhytlobud-1 Kharkiv players
WFC Donchanka Donetsk players
WFC Alina Kyiv players
WFC Naftokhimik Kalush players
WFC Dnipro Dnipropetrovsk players
WFC Iskra Zaporizhzhia players
Expatriate women's footballers in Russia
FC Energy Voronezh players
Ukraine women's international footballers
Women's association football midfielders
Ukrainian expatriate sportspeople in Russia